Robert James Corbett (August 25, 1905 – April 25, 1971) was a Republican member of the U.S. House of Representatives from Pennsylvania.

Biography
Robert Corbett was born in Avalon, Pennsylvania near Pittsburgh. He was the brother of the interim Governor of Guam William Corbett. He graduated from Allegheny College in Meadville, Pennsylvania in 1927 and from the University of Pittsburgh in 1929. He worked as senior high-school instructor at Coraopolis, Pennsylvania from 1929 to 1938, and as an instructor in the Pittsburgh Academy Evening School in 1938.

He was elected as a Republican to the 76th United States Congress in 1938, but was unsuccessful candidate for reelection in 1940.  After his defeat he served on the staff of Senator James J. Davis in Pittsburgh.  He was elected Sheriff of Allegheny County (Pittsburgh) and served from 1942 to 1944.  He was elected to the 79th United States Congress in 1944 and served from January 3, 1945, until his death from a heart attack in Pittsburgh, Pennsylvania on April 25, 1971. Corbett voted in favor of the Civil Rights Acts of 1957, 1960, 1964, and 1968, as well as the 24th Amendment to the U.S. Constitution and the Voting Rights Act of 1965.

See also
 List of United States Congress members who died in office (1950–99)

References

Sources

1905 births
1971 deaths
Politicians from Pittsburgh
University of Pittsburgh alumni
Allegheny College alumni
Allegheny County Sheriff
People from Coraopolis, Pennsylvania
Republican Party members of the United States House of Representatives from Pennsylvania
20th-century American politicians